Pacific Affairs (PA) is a Canadian peer-reviewed scholarly journal that publishes academic research on contemporary political, economic, and social issues in Asia and the Pacific. The journal was founded in 1926 as the newsletter for the entirety of the Institute of Pacific Relations (IPR). In May 1928, PA adopted its current name, and has been published continuously since. From 1934 to 1942, the journal was edited by Owen Lattimore, then William L. Holland.

The journal moved from the IPR headquarters in New York to the University of British Columbia in Vancouver, Canada, in 1961. Pressure from Senator Joseph McCarthy led to the dissolution of the IPR in 1960. It is currently housed in the Institute of Asian Research at the University of British Columbia.

The journal's executive committee is composed of an editor, associate editors (based on the following geographic regions: Asia General, East Asia (China and Inner Asia, Japan, Korea), South Asia, Southeast Asia, and Australasia and the Pacific Islands) and members representing Simon Fraser University, University of Victoria, University of Northern British Columbia, and the Asia Pacific Foundation of Canada.

Ingenta is the electronic provider for Pacific Affairs′ online subscriptions. Subscribers also have access to the entire contents of the journal from its inception in 1926 in JSTOR with a four-year moving wall.

In addition to scholarly articles based on original research, the journal publishes "perspectives," which are shorter articles, and often groups articles with a common theme into special issues. Some recent themes include renegotiating social risks in China and Japan, seeking agency for change in a hypermobile world, and ocean claims in the South Pacific.

Book reviews
PA publishes 40–50 book reviews in each issue, under the headings of Asia General; China and Inner Asia; Northeast Asia (Japan and Korea); South Asia; Southeast Asia; and Australasia and the Pacific Region. Books from social sciences and humanities disciplines are reviewed by reviewers who are invited by PA's executive committee. PA also publishes review articles which are also invited by the executive committee members. A review article is more in-depth, longer and compares the conclusions of several different authors on a single topic. The journal does not accept unsolicited book reviews.

In terms of chronological coverage, books that deal with topics before the 1900s are not reviewed unless there are explicit thematic or analytical links to contemporary affairs and/or theory.

References 

Articles
 “Our History”. pacificaffairs.ubc.ca
 “Articles on the history of Pacific Affairs”. pacificaffairs.ubc.ca
 Most popular articles of 2018 and all-time. pacificaffairs.ubc.ca

Books
 Hooper, Paul F. (ed) Remembering the Institute of Pacific Relations: The Memoirs of William L. Holland. Tokyo: Ryukei Shyosha, 1995. Also available at the University of British Columbia Library.

External links
Official website
Official archive
Pacific Affairs at ResearchGate

Asian studies journals
Oceanianists
Quarterly journals
International relations journals